Nyl River is a watercourse in Limpopo Province, South Africa. Nyl or NYL may also refer to:

Nyl Yakura (born 1993), Canadian badminton player
Nyl., taxonomic author abbreviation of William Nylander (1822–1899), Finnish botanist
National Youth League (disambiguation), various political and sports leagues
New York Life Insurance Company
Yuma International Airport (FAA LID: NYL)

See also
Nyls
Nile (disambiguation)
Nyle (disambiguation)